Chartres station (French: Gare de Chartres) is a railway station serving the town of Chartres in the Eure-et-Loir department and Centre-Val de Loire region of France. It is situated on the Paris–Brest railway. The station is part of the SNCF rail network and is served by TER Centre-Val de Loire and Ouigo trains.

History 
The original station was built in 1849.

Current building 

The station has been renovated five times since 1870.

In 1933, the current building was constructed under the authority of Raoul Dautry, the directeur général of the Chemins de fer de l'État. It was designed by the French architect Henri Pacon.

Since 2018, the station has been at the centre of a vast renewal of the city's urban core. The project is set to be finished by 2030.

References

Railway stations in Eure-et-Loir
TER Centre-Val de Loire
Gare
Railway stations in France opened in 1849